Michael is a 1996 American comedy fantasy film directed by Nora Ephron. The film stars John Travolta as the Archangel Michael, who is sent to Earth to do various tasks, including mending some wounded hearts. The cast also includes Andie MacDowell, William Hurt, Bob Hoskins, Joey Lauren Adams, and Robert Pastorelli as people who cross Michael's path.

The original music score was composed by Randy Newman. The dance scene and other location shots were filmed at the community center of Holy Trinity Catholic Church in Cornhill, Texas, and on country roads near Walburg, Texas, as well as at Texas' Gruene Hall.

Plot
The National Mirror is a tabloid publication that reports primarily on unexplainable phenomena. The editor, Vartan Malt, receives a story tip about a woman living with an angel in her house in a small town in Iowa, and decides to send three staff members to investigate. He chooses Frank Quinlan; Huey Driscoll, a photographer and owner of the Mirror star Sparky the Wonder Dog; and Dorothy Winters, hired by Malt to eventually replace Driscoll.

At the boarding house of Pansy Milbank, they meet her tenant Michael. While Michael has wings and smells like cookies, he has an unexpected taste for cigarettes and sugar, seems rather boorish at first, and does not appear clean. When pressed for the type of angel he is, he replies he is an archangel, with Pansy boasting he triumphed over Lucifer in the War in Heaven.

After Pansy unexpectedly dies, Frank and Huey decide to take Michael to Chicago. Michael reveals that this was his plan from the beginning. During the trip, Michael's mission on Earth is slowly revealed to be to get Frank and Dorothy together despite both having had bad experiences with love.

After Sparky is hit by a truck and killed, Michael brings him back to life. In the process, he uses up his allotment of miracles and begins to weaken. The group reaches Chicago just in time for Michael to see the Sears Tower (which he has always wanted to see) before disappearing. After Frank and Dorothy go their separate ways, Michael returns one more time (this time with Pansy in tow) and successfully gets Frank and Dorothy back together for good.

Cast

 John Travolta as Michael
 Andie MacDowell as Dorothy Winters 
 William Hurt as Frank Quinlan 
 Bob Hoskins as Vartan Malt 
 Robert Pastorelli as Huey Driscoll 
 Jean Stapleton as Pansy Milbank 
 Teri Garr as Judge Esther Newberg 
 Wallace Langham as Bruce Craddock 
 Joey Lauren Adams as Anita, Brown's waitress
 Richard Schiff as Italian waiter
 Carla Gugino as Bride
 Tom Hodges as Groom
 Sparky as Himself

Themes and interpretations
Contrary to popular depictions of angels, Michael is portrayed as a boozing, smoking slob – yet capable of imparting unexpected wisdom.

Professor Christopher R. Miller compared the depiction of angels in Michael to John Milton's in Paradise Lost. Milton presented angels as "six-winged shapeshifters who patrol the galaxy, leaving a vapor trail of heavenly fragrance in their wake." Miller notes Michael is portrayed as warring on Lucifer with shields resembling "two broad suns," and credits Michael with referencing this mythology.

Reception
The film received mixed to negative reviews, holding a 36% rating on Rotten Tomatoes based on 42 reviews. The site's consensus states: "John Travolta plays an angel in Nora Ephron's maudlin Michael, a grating comedy that doesn't tap into the heavenly charms of her best work." Emanuel Levy wrote in Variety that Michael is essentially a series of "lethargically paced" episodes with only flimsy connections to an overall narrative. He further criticized that the direction is scattered and uneven and Andie McDowell is inadequate in her role, though he praised the performances of John Travolta and William Hurt, remarking that Travolta's charm and sex appeal would make some moments enjoyable for female viewers. Owen Gleiberman, reviewing the film for Entertainment Weekly, instead attested that Travolta's performance is one of the film's worst problems, saying it "has a slovenly, I-can-do-anything-and-you'll-still-love-me obnoxiousness." He also felt it reflected poorly on Travolta to play a Messiah figure in two films in one year (the other being Phenomenon), and gave Michael a D+. David Ansen of Newsweek instead judged the film to be a mixed bag, with weak points including a contrived plot and Robert Pastorelli's performance, which nonetheless succeeds as a "low-key charmer" thanks to those moments where the attractive cast are allowed to play off of each other, such as the song in praise of pies.

Box office
The movie was a box office success. Released on Christmas Day, Michael finished number one at the box office that weekend, grossing $17,435,711 (roughly $3.4 million more than second-place Jerry Maguire, which was in its third week). The total domestic gross was $95,318,203, ranking Michael  number 16 for  1996.

See also
 List of films about angels

References

External links
 
 
 

1996 films
1990s road movies
1996 romantic comedy films
American comedy-drama films
American fantasy comedy films
American romantic comedy films
Films about angels
Films scored by Randy Newman
Films directed by Nora Ephron
Films set in Chicago
Films set in Iowa
Films shot in Texas
Films shot in New Braunfels, Texas
American road movies
Films with screenplays by Nora Ephron
Michael (archangel)
New Line Cinema films
1990s English-language films
1990s American films
Angels in popular culture